1933 in sports describes the year's events in world sport.

Events calendar

Unknown date

Alpine skiing
FIS Alpine World Ski Championships
3rd FIS Alpine World Ski Championships are held at Innsbruck, Austria.  The events are a downhill, a slalom and a combined race in both the men's and women's categories.  The winners are:
 Men's Downhill – Walter Prager (Switzerland)
 Men's Slalom – Anton Seelos (Austria)
 Men's Combined – Anton Seelos (Austria)
 Women's Downhill – Inge Wersin-Lantschner (Austria)
 Women's Slalom – Inge Wersin-Lantschner (Austria)
 Women's Combined – Inge Wersin-Lantschner (Austria)

Events
 Taft Slalom, the first racing trail in North America, is cut on Cannon Mountain in New Hampshire

American football
 NFL Championship: the Chicago Bears won 23–21 over the New York Giants at Wrigley Field
 Rose Bowl (1932 season):
 The USC Trojans won 35–0 over the Pittsburgh Panthers to share the college football national championship
 College football national championship – Michigan Wolverines
 Cincinnati Reds, Philadelphia Eagles and Pittsburgh Steelers all founded

Association football
Chile
 Chilean Primera Division, officially founded on May 31, and a first officially game held on July 22. 
England
 The Football League – Arsenal 58 points, Aston Villa 54, Sheffield Wednesday 51, West Bromwich Albion 49, Newcastle United 49, Huddersfield Town 47
 FA Cup final – Everton 3–0 Manchester City at Empire Stadium, Wembley, London
Germany
 National Championship – Fortuna Düsseldorf 3–0 F.C. Schalke 04 at Köln
Italy
 Serie A won by Juventus
France
 The inaugural season of French professional football is won by Olympique Lillois.

Australian rules football
VFL Premiership
 30 September – South Melbourne wins the 37th VFL Premiership defeating Richmond 9.17 (71) to 4.5 (29) at Melbourne Cricket Ground (MCG) in the 1933 VFL Grand Final
Brownlow Medal
 The annual Brownlow Medal is awarded to “Chicken” Smallhorn (Fitzroy)
South Australian National Football League
 14 October – West Torrens win their second SANFL premiership, defeating Norwood 13.10 (88) to 9.11 (65)
 Magarey Medal awarded to Keith Dunn (Sturt)
Western Australian National Football League
 16 September – George Doig becomes the first player to score 100 goals in a WA(N)FL season, doing this in the season of his league debut. Doig would score 100 goals every season until 1941, after which World War II ended open-age football until 1945.
 14 October – East Fremantle wins its seventeenth WANFL premiership, defeating Subiaco 10.13 (73) to 7.7 (49)
 Sandover Medal awarded to Sammy Clarke (Claremont-Cottesloe)

Bandy
Sweden
 Championship final – IFK Uppsala beats IF Göta 11-1

Baseball
World Series
 3–7 October - New York Giants (NL) defeats Washington Senators (AL) to win the 1933 World Series by 4 games to 1

Basketball
 Northwestern University wins the Big Ten Conference Championship in men's College Basketball.
 A first year of professional basketball game in Spain, Copa del Rey de Baloncesto was held on October 15. (as predecessor of Liga ACB)

Boxing
Events
 29 June – Primo Carnera defeats Jack Sharkey by a sixth-round knockout at Long Island City to win the World Heavyweight Championship
Lineal world champions
 World Heavyweight Championship – Jack Sharkey → Primo Carnera
 World Light Heavyweight Championship – Maxie Rosenbloom
 World Middleweight Championship – vacant
 World Welterweight Championship – Jackie Fields → Young Corbett III → Jimmy McLarnin 
 World Lightweight Championship – Tony Canzoneri → Barney Ross
 World Featherweight Championship – vacant
 World Bantamweight Championship – Panama Al Brown
 World Flyweight Championship – vacant

Cricket
Events
 England, employing bodyline tactics, beat Australia 4–1 to regain The Ashes.
England
 County Championship – Yorkshire
 Minor Counties Championship – undecided
 Most runs – Wally Hammond 3323 @ 67.81 (HS 264)
 Most wickets – Tich Freeman 298 @ 15.26 (BB 8–22)
 Wisden Cricketers of the Year – Fred Bakewell, George Headley, Stan Nichols, Leslie Townsend, Cyril Walters
 The West Indies make a second tour of England, and lose the three Test series two games to nil
Australia
 Sheffield Shield – New South Wales
 Most runs – Herbert Sutcliffe 1,318 @ 73.22 (HS 194)
 Most wickets – Bill O‘Reilly 62 @ 19.95 (BB 6–36)
India
 Bombay Quadrangular – not contested
New Zealand
 Plunket Shield – Otago
South Africa
 Currie Cup – not contested
West Indies
 Inter-Colonial Tournament – not contested

Cycling
Georges Speicher won the 1933 Tour de France
Alfredo Binda won the 1933 Giro d'Italia (5th win)
Georges Speicher won the men's road race at the 1933 UCI Road World Championships

Field hockey
 September 1 – foundation of Oranje Zwart, a Dutch club located in Eindhoven

Figure skating
World Figure Skating Championships
 Men's singles – Karl Schäfer
 Ladies’ singles – Sonja Henie
 Pairs – Emília Rotter and László Szollás

Golf
Major tournaments
 British Open – Denny Shute
 U.S. Open – Johnny Goodman
 PGA Championship – Gene Sarazen
Other tournaments
 British Amateur – Michael Scott
 U.S. Amateur – George Dunlap
 Women's Western Open – June Beebe

Horse racing
England
 Champion Hurdle – Insurance (2nd successive win)
 Cheltenham Gold Cup – Golden Miller (2nd successive win)
 Grand National – Kellsboro Jack
 1,000 Guineas Stakes – Brown Betty
 2,000 Guineas Stakes – Rodosto
 The Derby – Hyperion
 The Oaks – Chatelaine
 St. Leger Stakes – Hyperion
Australia
 Melbourne Cup – Hall Mark
Canada
 King's Plate – King O'Connor
France
 Prix de l'Arc de Triomphe – Crapom
Ireland
 Irish Grand National – Red Park
 Irish Derby Stakes – Harinero 
USA
 Kentucky Derby – Broker's Tip
 Preakness Stakes – Head Play
 Belmont Stakes – Hurryoff

Ice hockey
4 April - 13 April – New York Rangers defeat Toronto Maple Leafs 3–1 in a best of five series to win their second Stanley Cup.

Motorsport

 February 22 - Malcolm Campbell sets world land speed record speed of 272.46 mph driving his famous Blue Bird car at Daytona Beach, Florida

Nordic skiing
FIS Nordic World Ski Championships
 7th FIS Nordic World Ski Championships 1933 are held at Innsbruck, Austria

Radiosport
Events
 First ever ARRL Field Day contest held in July

Rowing
The Boat Race
 1 April — Cambridge wins the 85th Oxford and Cambridge Boat Race

Rugby league
England
 Championship – Salford
 Challenge Cup final – at Empire Stadium, Wembley, London
 Lancashire League Championship – Salford
 Yorkshire League Championship – Castleford
 Lancashire County Cup – Warrington
 Yorkshire County Cup – Leeds
Australia
 NSW Premiership – Newtown 18–4 St. George (grand final)
An exhibition match between Great Britain and Australia at Paris' Stade Pershing in December 1933 inspired the beginnings of rugby league in France.

Rugby union
Home Nations Championship
 46th Home Nations Championship series is won by Scotland

Snooker
World Championship
 7th World Snooker Championship is won by Joe Davis who defeats Willie Smith 25–18

Speed skating
Speed Skating World Championships
 Men's All-round Champion – Hans Engnestangen (Norway)

Tennis
Australia
 Australian Men's Singles Championship – Jack Crawford (Australia) defeats Keith Gledhill (USA) 2–6, 7–5, 6–3, 6–2
 Australian Women's Singles Championship – Joan Hartigan Bathurst (Australia) defeats Coral Buttsworth (Australia) 6–4, 6–3 
England
 Wimbledon Men's Singles Championship – Jack Crawford (Australia) defeats Ellsworth Vines (USA) 4–6, 11–9, 6–2, 2–6, 6–4 
 Wimbledon Women's Singles Championship – Helen Wills Moody (USA) defeats Dorothy Round Little (Great Britain) 6–4, 6–8, 6–3
France
 French Men's Singles Championship – Jack Crawford (Australia) defeats Henri Cochet (France) 8–6, 6–1, 6–3
 French Women's Singles Championship – Margaret Scriven Vivian (Great Britain) defeats Simonne Mathieu (France) 6–2, 4–6, 6–4
USA
 American Men's Singles Championship – Fred Perry (Great Britain) defeats Jack Crawford (Australia) 6–3, 11–13, 4–6, 6–0, 6–1
 American Women's Singles Championship – Helen Jacobs (USA) defeats Helen Wills Moody (USA) 8–6, 3–6, 3–0, retired
Davis Cup
 1933 International Lawn Tennis Challenge –  at 3–2  at Stade Roland Garros (clay) Paris, France

Awards
Associated Press Athlete of the Year
 Associated Press Male Athlete of the Year – Carl Hubbell (baseball)
 Associated Press Female Athlete of the Year – Helen Jacobs (tennis)

Notes
An error in calculating points caused Yorkshire Second Eleven to meet and defeat Norfolk in the Minor Counties Challenge Match when that honour should have gone to Wiltshire; by the time the error was discovered, it was October and the weather was unsuitable for cricket, so the Championship was ruled “undecided”

References

 
Sports by year